was a Japanese era name (年号, nengō, lit. year name) after Enkyū and before Jōryaku. This period spanned the years from August 1074 through November 1077.

Change of Era
 January 30, 1074 : The new era name was created to mark an event or series of events. The previous era ended and the new one commenced in Enkyū 6, on the 23rd day of the 8th month of 1074.

Events of the Jōhō Era
 1074 (Jōhō 1, 1st month): Dianagon Minamoto- no Takakune asked to be relieved of his duties because of his age. He was 71, and he wanted to retire to Uji. In his retirement, he was visited by many friends with whom he pursued research into the history of Japan. He brought this work together in a book.
 March 7, 1074 (Jōhō 1, 7th day of the 2nd month): The former kampaku Fujiwara Yorimichi died at the age of 83. In this same period, his sister, the widow of Emperor Ichijo, died at the age of 87.
 October 25, 1074 (Jōhō 1, 3rd day of the 10th month): Empress Jōtō-mon In died at the age of 87.

Notes

References
 Brown, Delmer M. and Ichirō Ishida, eds. (1979).  Gukanshō: The Future and the Past. Berkeley: University of California Press. ;  OCLC 251325323
 Nussbaum, Louis-Frédéric and Käthe Roth. (2005).  Japan encyclopedia. Cambridge: Harvard University Press. ;  OCLC 58053128
 Titsingh, Isaac. (1834). Nihon Odai Ichiran; ou,  Annales des empereurs du Japon.  Paris: Royal Asiatic Society, Oriental Translation Fund of Great Britain and Ireland. OCLC 5850691
 Varley, H. Paul. (1980). A Chronicle of Gods and Sovereigns: Jinnō Shōtōki of Kitabatake Chikafusa. New York: Columbia University Press. ;  OCLC 6042764

External links
 National Diet Library, "The Japanese Calendar" -- historical overview plus illustrative images from library's collection

Japanese eras